The Itomuka mine is one of the largest mercury mines in Japan and in the world. The mine is located in Hokkaido. The mine has estimated reserves of 0.95 million tonnes of ore grading 0.35% mercury.

References 

Mercury mines in Japan
Nomura Holdings